Muratpaşa is a district in Antalya, Turkey. Mediterranean Sea is in south of district. Ümit Uysal is the mayor of Muratpaşa.

History

Modern day district of Muratpaşa is home to Kaleiçi, the historic center founded by Attalus II, King of Pergamon  around 150 BC. Since then, the district has been under Lydian, Roman, Persian, Byzantine, Seljuk, Cypriot, Teke, Ottoman, and —after the Italian occupation— Turkish rule.

See also
 Muratpaşa Belediyesi Spor Kulübü, the local sports club

References

External links
 Muratpaşa District Governorate 
 Muratpaşa Municipality

Antalya